In Roman law, a constitution is a generic name for a legislative enactment by a Roman emperor. It includes edicts, decrees (judicial decisions) and rescripts (written answers to officials or petitioners). Mandata (instructions) given by the Emperor to officials were not Constitutions but created legal rules that could be relied upon by individuals.

One of the most important constitutions issued by a Roman emperor was Caracalla's Constitutio Antoniniana of 212, also called the Edict of Caracalla or the Antonine Constitution, which declared that all free men of the Roman Empire were to be given Roman citizenship and all free women in the Empire were to be given the same rights as Roman women.

See also
 Roman Constitution

References

Further reading
H. F. Jolowicz and B. Nicholas, Historical Introduction to Roman Law, 3rd edn. (1972)
Tony Honoré, Emperors and Lawyers (1981; 2nd edn. 1994).

Roman law